Southern Dobruja, South Dobruja or Quadrilateral (Bulgarian: Южна Добруджа, Yuzhna Dobrudzha or simply Добруджа, Dobrudzha; ,  or ) is an area of north-eastern Bulgaria comprising Dobrich and Silistra provinces, part of the historical region of Dobruja. It has an area of 7,566 km2 and a population of 358,000. It was a part of Kingdom of Romania de jure from 1913 to 1918 (de facto from 1913 to 1916) and again from 1919 to 1940.

History

At the beginning of the modern era, Southern Dobruja had a mixed population of Bulgarians and Turks with several smaller minorities, including Gagauz, Crimean Tatars and Romanians. In 1910, of the 282,007 inhabitants of Southern Dobruja, 134,355 (47.6%) were Bulgarians, 106,568 (37.8%) Turks, 12,192 (4.3%) Roma, 11,718 (4.1%) Tatars, and 6,484 (2.4%) Romanians.

Southern Dobruja was part of the autonomous Bulgarian principality from 1878 and part of the independent Bulgarian state from 1908 until Bulgaria's defeat in the Second Balkan War, when the region was ceded to Romania under the Treaty of Bucharest (1913). 

In 1914, Romania demanded all landowners prove their property and surrender to the Romanian state one third of the land they claimed or pay an equivalent of its value. This was similar to the agrarian reforms in Romania which occurred the previous century, in which the landlords had to give up two-thirds of their land, which was then handed over to the peasants. In Southern Dobruja, many of the peasants who received the land were settlers, including tens of thousands of Aromanians from Macedonia, as well as Megleno-Romanians from the same place and Romanians from Wallachia, which led to claims that the reforms had a nationalist purpose.

On 7 September 1940, Southern Dobruja was restored to Bulgaria under the Treaty of Craiova. The treaty was followed by a mandatory population exchange: about 110,000 Romanians (almost 95% of whom settled there after 1913), Aromanians and Megleno-Romanians were forced to leave Southern Dobruja, whereas 77,000 Bulgarians had to leave Northern Dobruja. Only a few hundred Romanians and Aromanians are now left in the region.

Demographic history

1According to the 1926–1938 Romanian administrative division (counties of Durostor and Caliacra), which included a part of today's Romania (chiefly the communes of Ostrov and Lipnița, now part of Constanța County) and excluded a part of today's Bulgaria (parts of General Toshevo and Krushari municipalities)
2Including persons counted as Vlachs in Bulgarian Census
3Only includes persons who answered the optional question on ethnic identity. The total population was 309,151.

Administrative divisions

Between 1913 and 1940, during the Romanian rule, the region covered two counties: Durostor and Caliacra. Nowadays, the territory of Southern Dobruja forms the provinces of Silistra and Dobrich.

See also 
 Northern Dobruja
 Balchik Palace, summer palace residence of Queen Marie of Romania

References

Geographical regions of Bulgaria